Kidan Tesfahun  is an Ethiopian model and national beauty queen.

Biography
Kidan was crowned Ethiopia's Miss Millennium Queen
organised by London-based Ethiopian Life Foundation in 2007. She subsequently represented Ethiopia in Miss Earth 2008 in Quezon City, Philippines, as well as Miss International 2007 in Tokyo, Japan.

Kidan is an executive secretary in Addis Ababa and she plans to continue her studies in a foreign country to obtain international experience.

On 24 July 2009, she was named Best Female Model of the World 2009 at a fashion modeling contest organized by Sukier Models International in Alicante, Spain.

References

External links
Miss Ethiopia ORG
Miss Earth 2008 candidates

Miss Earth 2008 contestants
Ethiopian female models
Living people
1984 births
Ethiopian beauty pageant winners